What Ho! Jeeves (sometimes written What Ho, Jeeves!) is a series of radio dramas based on some of the Jeeves short stories and novels written by P. G. Wodehouse, starring Michael Hordern as the titular Jeeves and Richard Briers as Bertie Wooster.

The stories were adapted for radio by Chris Miller, except the last two novels featured in the series, which were dramatised by Richard Usborne. The series was first broadcast from 1973 to 1981 on BBC Radio 4.

Production

The novels were adapted into several episodes. Each episode is approximately 30 minutes long, except for the episodes adapted from Thank You, Jeeves and The Mating Season, which are each about 45 minutes long.

"The Ordeal of Young Tuppy" and Joy in the Morning episodes were produced by Simon Brett. The Thank You, Jeeves and The Mating Season episodes were produced by Peter Titheridge. The episodes adapted from The Inimitable Jeeves, The Code of the Woosters, Jeeves and the Feudal Spirit, and Stiff Upper Lip, Jeeves were produced by David Hatch.

Six of the dramatized books are included in the audio collection Jeeves & Wooster: The Collected Radio Dramas, published by BBC Books in 2013. Some episodes occasionally air on BBC Radio 4 Extra.

Main cast
 Bertie Wooster — Richard Briers
 Jeeves — Michael Hordern
 Bingo Little — Jonathan Cecil
 Aunt Agatha — Joan Sanderson
 Honoria Glossop — Miriam Margolyes
 Sir Roderick Glossop — Andrew Cruickshank (1973), John Graham (1975)
 Aunt Dahlia — Vivian Pickles
 Gussie Fink-Nottle — Rex Garner (1973), David Valla (1975), Jonathan Cecil (1980)
 Madeline Bassett — Bridget Armstrong (1973), Aimi MacDonald (1980)
 Tuppy Glossop — Ray Cooney (1973), Stephen Moore (1976) 
 Roderick Spode (later the Earl of Sidcup) — James Villiers (1973), Paul Eddington (1980)
 Lady Florence Craye — Bronwen Williams (1978), Liza Goddard (1979))
 Sir Watkyn Bassett – Patrick Cargill (1973), John Le Mesurier (1980)
 Stephanie "Stiffy" Byng – Miriam Margolyes (1973), Denise Coffey (1980)

Episode list
The series features eight multipart adaptations. A standalone episode adapted from the short story, "The Ordeal of Young Tuppy" (1930), was also aired, and first broadcast on 27 December 1976.

The Inimitable Jeeves
Adapted from The Inimitable Jeeves (1923). The cast included Ronald Fraser as Mortimer Little, Maurice Denham as the Rev. Heppenstall, Jonathan Lynn and David Jason as Claude and Eustace, and Edwin Apps as Steggles.

Right Ho, Jeeves
Adapted from Right Ho, Jeeves (1934). The cast included John Graham as Uncle Tom and Anatole, and Jennie Goossens as Angela.

The Code of the Woosters
Adapted from The Code of the Woosters (1938). The cast included Douglas Blackwell as Harold Pinker and Tony McEwan as PC Oates.

Thank You, Jeeves
Adapted from Thank You, Jeeves (1934). The cast included Clive Francis as Lord Chuffnell, Connie Booth as Pauline Stoker, Jo Manning-Wilson as Seabury, Blain Fairman as J. Washburn Stoker, John Dunbar as Sergeant Voules, John Bull as Constable Dobson, and Alaric Cotter as Brinkley.

The Mating Season
Adapted from The Mating Season (1949). The cast included James Villiers as Esmond Haddock, Jo Kendall as Corky Pirbright, Kenneth Fortescue as Catsmeat Pirbright, Miriam Margoyles as Dame Daphne Winkworth and Hilda Gudgeon, John Dunbar as Silversmith, and Antony Higginson as the Rev. Sydney Pirbright and Constable Dobbs.

Joy in the Morning
Adapted from Joy in the Morning (1946). The cast included Peter Woodthorpe as Lord Worplesdon, Jonathan Cecil as Boko Fittleworth, Denise Bryer as Edwin the Boy Scout, Rosalind Adams as Nobby Hopwood, and Michael Kilgarriff as Stilton Cheesewright.

Jeeves and the Feudal Spirit
Adapted from Jeeves and the Feudal Spirit (1954). The cast included James Villiers as Stilton Cheesewright, Jonathan Cecil as Percy Gorringe, Norman Bird as L. G. Trotter, Diana King as Mrs Trotter, Ann Davies as Daphne Dolores Morehead, Liza Goddard as Lady Florence Crayne and David Tate as Stebbings.

Stiff Upper Lip, Jeeves
Adapted from Stiff Upper Lip, Jeeves (1963). The cast included Douglas Blackwell as the Rev. Harold Pinker, Ann Davies as Emerald Stoker, Ronald Fraser as Major Plank, Percy Edwards as the dog Bartholomew. and Graham Faulkner as Constable Oates.

References
Notes

Sources
 

Adaptations of works by P. G. Wodehouse
British radio dramas
1973 radio programme debuts